Ämari Air Base   is a military airbase in Harjumaa, Estonia located  south of Lake Klooga and  southwest of Tallinn.

History

Ämari Air Base was built between 1940–1952 under an agreement signed by the Estonian SSR and the Soviet Union. In 1945, the USSR Ministry of Defense established a naval reserve airfield of its Baltic Fleet there, where the amphibious seaplanes of the 69th Long-Range Reconnaissance Regiment Catalina PBY-5A and the escort fighter jets Yak-9P began to be based. It became the main airport for the units located in Ämari in 1952. During the Vietnam War the Ämari Air Base was a training facility for Soviet pilots to fly MiG-15, MiG-15bis, Mig-17, and MiG-19 aircraft before deployment to Vietnam as "Military advisor pilots" and deployment to Arab countries during the wars against Israel. After 1975, the units replaced their obsolete MiGs for Sukhoi assault planes. Later, Ämari was home to 321 and/or 170 MShAP (321st and/or 170th Naval Shturmovik Aviation Regiment) flying Sukhoi Su-24 aircraft. After the dissolution of the Soviet Union, the Russian Air Force continued to administer the Ämari Air Base until it was handed over to Estonia in 1994.

The Estonian Air Force Air Surveillance Wing was created on 1 January 1998 and is located at the Ämari Air Base.

After Estonia's accession to the North Atlantic Treaty Organization (NATO) in 2004, Ämari Air Base was made NATO interoperable. NATO aircraft have been stationed at the base since 2014.

Current use

Since April 2014, Ämari Air Base has hosted NATO Baltic Air Policing patrols. On 30 April 2014 this mission began with the arrival of four Danish F-16s.

During 2015 it was announced that the aerial assets from the American Operation Atlantic Resolve would be based there.

In September 2015, Lockheed Martin F-22 Raptor fighters visited Ämari.

See also 
 Lielvārde Air Base
 Šiauliai Air Base

References and notes
References

Notes

External links

Airports in Estonia
Estonian Air Force
Military installations of Estonia
Soviet Naval Aviation bases
1940s establishments in Estonia
Lääne-Harju Parish
Buildings and structures in Harju County